Oil Price Information Service (OPIS) is a price-reporting agency which provides information that is used for commercial contracts and trade settlement related to petroleum, gasoline, diesel, ethanol, biodiesel, LP-gas, jet fuel, crude, natural gas, petrochemicals, recycled plastics, refinery feedstocks, residual fuel, and kerosene.  It is based in Rockville, Maryland and has offices in  New Jersey, Houston, Texas, Minnesota, and internationally in Sweden, Romania, Singapore, and Japan.

On August 2, 2021, it was announced that News Corp, parent company of Dow Jones & Co., would buy OPIS from IHS Markit for US$1.15 billion. When the purchase was finalized on February 28, 2022, the company became a unit of News Corp.

History
OPIS is one of the four main Price Reporting Agencies (PRAs) for market price reporting including daily market price assessments that are "fair, efficient, and transparent" in addition to Platts, Argus Media and ICIS according to the International Organization of Securities Commissions.

OPIS is a benchmark in multiple areas including Propane, and NGL. In 2016 it made available four new contracts for trading at ICE Futures Europe.

Acquisitions
1996 - OPIS acquired the Stalsby/Wilson Directory business and Computer Petroleum Corp. (CPC).
2005 - OPIS acquired Axxis Software.
2012 - OPIS acquired PointLogic Energy (formerly LCI Energy Insight).
2013 - OPIS acquired GasBuddy.
2015 – OPIS acquires NAVX, the leading European and South American provider of retail fuel pricing, parking and Electric Vehicle (EV) charging location information.
2016 – IHS Markit acquires OPIS for $650 Million.
2018 - OPIS acquires Petrochem Wire.

References

Companies based in Gaithersburg, Maryland
American companies established in 1977
2016 mergers and acquisitions
2022 mergers and acquisitions
Dow Jones & Company